USS Bon Homme Richard (CV/CVA-31) was the 14th of the 24 s completed during or shortly after World War II for the United States Navy. She was the second US Navy ship to bear the name, the first one being named for John Paul Jones's famous Revolutionary War frigate by the same name.  Jones had named that ship, usually rendered in more correct French as Bonhomme Richard, to honor Founding Father Benjamin Franklin, the American Commissioner at Paris, whose Poor Richard's Almanack had been published in France under the title Les Maximes du Bonhomme Richard.

Bon Homme Richard was commissioned in November 1944, the last of the Essex class completed in time to serve in what would be the final campaigns of the Pacific Theater of Operations, earning one battle star. Decommissioned shortly after the end of the war, she was recommissioned in 1951 for the Korean War. In her second career she operated exclusively in the Pacific, playing a prominent role in the Korean War, for which she earned five battle stars, and the Vietnam War. She was modernized and recommissioned in 1955. She was decommissioned in 1971, and scrapped in 1992.

Construction and commissioning
Bon Homme Richard (CV-31) was laid down on 1 February 1943 at the New York Navy Yard, being the first Essex-class carrier to be built at the New York Navy Yard. She was launched 29 April 1944 by Mrs. John S. McCain, wife of Vice Admiral John S. McCain Sr. The ship was commissioned 26 November 1944, with Captain A. O. Rule Jr. as her first commander.

Service history

World War II
Bon Homme Richard departed Norfolk, Virginia, on 19 March 1945 to join the Pacific Fleet and arrived at Pearl Harbor on 5 April 1945. Following additional training in Hawaiian waters, the carrier joined TF 38 off Okinawa on 6 June 1945 with Carrier Air Group 91 (CVG-91) aboard. During 7–10 June she joined in the attacks on Okidaitōjima and then served with the 3rd Fleet during the air strikes against Japan from 2 July to 15 August. She remained off Japan until 16 September 1945 and after a short training period off Guam, proceeded to San Francisco, arriving 20 October. She left San Francisco 29 October and steamed to Pearl Harbor to undergo conversion for troop transport duty. From 8 November 1945 to 16 January 1946 she made trans-Pacific voyages, returning servicemen to the United States. She was thereafter generally inactive until decommissioning on 9 January 1947. She was mothballed at the Puget Sound Naval Shipyard, Bremerton, Washington.

Korean War
The outbreak of the Korean War on 25 June 1950 called Bon Homme Richard back to active duty. She recommissioned on 15 January 1951 in an unmodernized state and joined TF 77 off Korea on 29 May and launched the first air strikes of CVG-102 on 31 May. Bon Homme Richard continued operations with TF 77 until 20 November 1951. The carrier reached San Diego in mid-December and on 20 May 1952 was off again to the Far East, this time with CVG-7. She joined TF 77 once more on 23 June and took part in the heavy strikes against the Sui-ho Dam on 24–25 June and the amphibious feint at Kojo from 12 to 16 October. She continued operations against North Korean targets until 18 December 1952 and then steamed to San Francisco where she arrived 8 January 1953. Her classification was changed from CV-31 to CVA-31 on 1 October 1952.

Modernization
Bon Homme Richard then went out of commission on 15 May 1953 preparatory to modernization at the San Francisco Naval Shipyard. She was one of three Essex-class carriers to receive the SCB-27C and SCB-125 modernizations on one refit. Bon Homme Richard emerged from the shipyard with an angled and strengthened flight deck, enclosed "hurricane" bow, steam catapults, a new island, wider beam and many other improvements. She completed her conversion period 31 October 1955 and commenced sea trials in the Alameda-San Diego area. She was recommissioned on 6 September 1955 and began the first of a long series of 7th Fleet deployments on 16 August 1956 with CVG-21 embarked. CVG-5 reported aboard for the 1957 deployment, before CVG-19 reported aboard for the next six deployments in 1958–1959, 1959–1960, 1961, 1962–1963, 1964, and 1965–66. The 1964 cruise included a voyage into the Indian Ocean. Bon Homme Richard also had been in the Indian Ocean for a goodwill trip to Bombay, India, at the direction of President Eisenhower during the 1959-1960 Pacific cruise.

Vietnam War
Admiral George Stephen Morrison, father of The Doors lead singer Jim Morrison, flew his flag on Bon Homme Richard. Popular myth has it that he had some involvement in the Tonkin Gulf Incident, because he was commander of the U.S. naval forces in the Gulf of Tonkin during the Gulf of Tonkin Incident of August 1964. The Vietnam War escalation in early 1965 brought Bon Homme Richard into a third armed conflict, and she deployed on five Southeast Asia combat tours over the next six years. Her aircraft battled North Vietnamese MiGs on many occasions, downing several, as well as striking transportation and infrastructure targets. Occasional excursions to other Asian areas provided some variety to her operations. Carrier Air Wing 21 (CVW-21) joined the Bon Homme Richard for the 1967 deployment to Vietnam. CVW-5 was aboard again for the last three deployments in 1968, 1969, and 1970. Bon Homme Richard was ordered inactivated at the end of her 1970 deployment. She was decommissioned on 2 July 1971, becoming part of the Reserve Fleet at Bremerton, Washington. Adm. Morrison was the keynote speaker at the Decommissioning Ceremony on 2 July 1971 which was one day before his estranged son, Jim, died in Paris, France.

Following 20 years in mothballs, she was sold for scrap in March 1992. She was scrapped at Southwest Marine's yard in San Pedro, California.

Awards
Bon Homme Richard received one battle star for her World War II service, and five for the Korean War.
The Bon Homme Richard received three Navy Unit Citations (NUC): One NUC for actions during the Korean War; one NUC for actions during the Vietnam War in 1967 and a third NUC for actions during the Vietnam War in 1968. In 1972, however, the 1967 NUC was replaced with a Presidential Unit Citation (PUC) from president Richard Nixon. Therefore, the ship received a total of two NUC's and one PUC.

 Presidential Unit Citation
 Navy Unit Commendation (2)
 Navy Meritorious Unit Commendation (2)
 American Campaign Medal 
 Asiatic-Pacific Campaign Medal (1 battle star)
 World War II Victory Medal
 Navy Occupation Service Medal (with Asia clasp)
 National Defense Service Medal (2)
 Korean Service Medal (5 stars)
 Armed Forces Expeditionary Medal (2) 
 Vietnam Service Medal (10 battle stars) 
 Republic of Vietnam Meritorious Unit Citation (Gallantry Cross Medal with Palm)
 United Nations Korean Medal
 Republic of Vietnam Campaign Medal 
 Republic of Korea War Service Medal (retroactive)

Gallery

References

 Gardiner, Robert and Roger Chesneau. Conway's All the World's Fighting Ships 1922–1946. London: Conway Maritime Press, 1980. .
 
 Anon. Second Hitch: U.S.S. Bon Homme Richard CV 31. Seattle: Naval Publishing, c. 1952. Covers the carrier's Korean War Service.

External links

 USS BonHomme Richard
 USS Bon Homme Richard CV/CVA 31

Essex-class aircraft carriers
Ships built in Brooklyn
1944 ships
World War II aircraft carriers of the United States
Cold War aircraft carriers of the United States
Korean War aircraft carriers of the United States
Vietnam War aircraft carriers of the United States
Ships named for Founding Fathers of the United States